Hyuk-jae is a Korean masculine given name. Its meaning depends on the hanja used to write each syllable of the name. There are nine hanja with the reading "hyuk" and 20 hanja with the reading "jae" on the South Korean government's official list of hanja which may be registered for use in given names. People with this name include:

Lee Hyuk-jae (born 1973), South Korean comedian
Eunhyuk (born Lee Hyuk-jae, 1986), South Korean singer, member of Super Junior
Jae Yoo (born Yoo Hyuk-jae, 1989), South Korean model
Kim Hyuk-jae, South Korean bass guitarist, member of 24Hours

See also
List of Korean given names

References

Korean masculine given names